Kobyle may refer to the following places:
Kobyle, Lesser Poland Voivodeship (south Poland)
Kobyle, Lublin Voivodeship (east Poland)
Kobyle, Subcarpathian Voivodeship (south-east Poland)
Kobyle, Pomeranian Voivodeship (north Poland)